The Best of Eddie Rabbitt is the first compilation album by American country music artist Eddie Rabbitt. It was released in 1979 via Elektra Records.

Track listing

Chart performance

References

1979 compilation albums
Eddie Rabbitt albums
Albums produced by Snuff Garrett
Albums produced by David Malloy
Elektra Records compilation albums